The islands of Somalia are located adjacent to the Gulf of Aden to the north, the Guardafui Channel at the apex of its territory, and the Somali Sea to the east.

Gulf of Aden
Somalia's only islands in the Gulf of Aden are located in the Zeila Archipelago, the largest islands of which are Sacadin and Aibat.

Guardafui Channel
Jasiirada Khuuri, which is located in the Guardafui Channel is a mere 100 kilometers from the coast of Cape Guardafui. However, since it is administrated in the Socotra Governorate, it is under Yemeni jurisdiction. Despite Khuuri and the other three islands being less than 370 km (the United Nations Convention on the Law of the Sea's definition of a state's exclusive economic zone) from Somalia's coast, they do not fall under the exclusive economic zone of Somalia. Subsequently, Somalia has submitted a request to the UN to discuss sovereignty.

Somali Sea
There are six main islands in the Bajuni archipelago. They are Jasiirada Chandra, Jasiirada Chovaye, Jasiirada Chula, Jasiirada Koyama, Jasiirada Darakasi and Jasiirada Ngumi.

References

 
Islands